Ralph Wendell Bryant (born May 20, 1961) is a retired Major League Baseball player. He played with the Los Angeles Dodgers in the major leagues, and with the Chunichi Dragons and Kintetsu Buffaloes in Nippon Professional Baseball. He batted left-handed, threw right-handed, and played outfield for most of his career.

Career
Born in Fort Gaines, Georgia,  Bryant studied at Abraham Baldwin Agricultural College. He was drafted in the first round of the 1981 amateur draft by the Los Angeles Dodgers, having previously been drafted by the Dodgers and Minnesota Twins, but did not sign with either team that year.

In , the Chunichi Dragons of the Japanese Central League showed interest in Bryant, and he was shipped to Japan in May, 1988.

On June 7, 1988, Dick Davis, the cleanup batter of the Kintetsu Buffaloes, was arrested on drug charges, and the Buffaloes were forced to let go of one of their best hitters mid-season. Unable to fill the offensive void left by Davis, the Buffaloes found Bryant, who was playing on the Dragons minor league team. After seeing Bryant blast a home run in a minor league game, the Buffaloes offered to purchase his contract. The Dragons minor league staff was opposed to the trade, but regulations allowed for only two non-Japanese players per team, and the Dragons already had Taiwanese baseball star Genji Kaku and slugger Gary Rajsich on their roster, leaving no room for Bryant. The purchase was finalized on June 28, giving birth to one of the best left-handed power hitters in Japanese baseball history.

Bryant quickly established his presence with the Buffaloes, hitting 34 home runs in only 74 games to contribute to their huge comeback which put the team in a close second place to the Seibu Lions in 1988. Ironically, many Buffaloes home games that year were held in the Nagoya Baseball Stadium, the home field of the Chunichi Dragons.

He won the season MVP award that year, and also tied Sadaharu Oh's career record for hitting 3 home runs in a game 5 times. He continued his success in subsequent seasons, and retired in  after missing most of that year due to injuries. He left this job after only one year, but blasted three home runs in an inter-league home run contest during the season.

Though he hit a large number of home runs throughout his career, he also struck out countless times, and holds the top four spots on the single-season strikeout records in Nippon Professional Baseball. Bryant was also the first player with MLB experience to strike out more than 200 times per season in both the Central League and Pacific League.

External links

1961 births
African-American baseball players
Albuquerque Dukes players
American expatriate baseball players in Japan
Caimanes del Sur players
American expatriate baseball players in the Dominican Republic
Chunichi Dragons players
Kintetsu Buffaloes players
Midland Angels players
Lethbridge Dodgers players
Living people
Los Angeles Dodgers players
Major League Baseball outfielders
Nippon Professional Baseball coaches
Nippon Professional Baseball designated hitters
Nippon Professional Baseball MVP Award winners
People from Fort Gaines, Georgia
San Antonio Dodgers players
Vero Beach Dodgers players
21st-century African-American people
20th-century African-American sportspeople